Pseudahrensia  is a genus of bacteria from the order of Hyphomicrobiales.

References

Further reading 
 
 

Hyphomicrobiales
Bacteria genera